Catlateral Damage is a first-person video game in which the player plays as a cat. The goal of the game is to knock as many of the player character's owner's belongings onto the floor as possible. There are game modes in which the player can either race against the clock and get a certain number of items onto the floor as fast as they can, score as many points in a 2-minute time-frame, or a free play mode where there is no clock and there are no points.

Development 
The original version of Catlateral Damage was created for the August 2013 7DFPS game jam. Development for a full release began in September 2013.

On 13 January 2014, Catlateral Damage was released on Steam's "Steam Greenlight" service. There was a Kickstarter campaign for the game that ran between 16 June 2014 and 11 July 2014. The full version of the game was released on Steam on 27 May 2015.

Reception

Original release 

BuzzFeeds Joseph Bernstein reviewed the original Catlateral Damage favorably citing "If you have ever wanted to know what it is like to be a little feline menace, this is your chance."

Kotakus Luke Plunkett reviewed the original Catlateral Damage as "as accurate a cat simulator as you'll ever play."

Rock, Paper, Shotguns Nathan Grayson reviewed the original Catlateral Damage as "basic and inconsequential as can be, and that's exactly what I wanted from it. Be a cat. Do total jerkstore asshole cat things. The end."

 Alpha release 
CNET'''s Michelle Starr reviewed the alpha release of Catlateral Damage as "kind of really fun."Indie Statiks Chris Priestman reviewed the alpha release of Catlateral Damage as "a fun little game about making a mess. What's not to love?"Joystiqs Danny Cowan reviewed the alpha release of Catlateral Damage favorably with "For anyone who has never owned cats, this is a fairly accurate simulation of what their day-to-day life entails."VG247s Mike Irving reviewed the alpha release of Catlateral Damage'' as "small and rough at the moment" but found the game "entertaining."

References

External links 
Official site

2013 video games
2014 video games
Biological simulation video games
Game jam video games
HTC Vive games
Indie video games
Linux games
MacOS games
Oculus Rift games
Ouya games
PlayStation 4 games
PlayStation VR games
Simulation video games
Single-player video games
Video games about cats
Video games developed in the United States
Video games using procedural generation
Windows games